A Sunday roast or roast dinner is a traditional meal of British and Irish origin. Although it can be consumed throughout the week, it is traditionally consumed on Sunday. It consists of roasted meat, mashed potatoes, roasted potatoes and accompaniments such as Yorkshire pudding, stuffing, gravy, and condiments such as apple sauce, mint sauce, or redcurrant sauce. A wide range of vegetables can be served as part of a roast dinner, such as broccoli, Brussels sprouts, cabbage, carrots, cauliflower, parsnips, or peas, which can be boiled, steamed, or roasted alongside the meat and potatoes. 

The Sunday roast's prominence in British culture is such that in a UK poll in 2012 it was ranked second in a list of things people love about Britain. Other names for this meal include Sunday lunch, Sunday dinner, roast dinner, and full roast. The meal is often comparable to a less grand version of a traditional Christmas dinner.

Besides being served in its original homelands, the tradition of a Sunday roast lunch or dinner has been a major influence on food cultures in the English-speaking world, particularly in Australia, Canada, South Africa, the United States, and New Zealand. A South African Sunday roast normally comprises roast pork, beef, lamb or chicken, roast potatoes, mashed potatoes, pumpkin fritters, Yorkshire pudding, and various vegetables like cauliflower-broccoli cheese, creamed spinach, mashed or roasted butternut squash, green beans, carrots, peas, fresh corn, beetroot, and sweet potato. It is also fairly common to serve rice and gravy in South Africa instead of Yorkshire pudding.

Origin

The Sunday roast originated in the British Isles particularly Yorkshire as a meal to be eaten after the church service on Sunday. Eating a large meal following church services is common to most of Europe, but the Sunday roast variant developed unique to the British Isles. On Sundays, all types of meat and dairy produce are allowed to be eaten; this is unlike Fridays, where many Christians of the Roman Catholic, Anglican and Methodist denominations traditionally abstain from eating meats, so ate fish instead.<ref name="Wesley1825">{{cite book |author1=John Wesley |title=The Sunday Service of the Methodists |date=1825 |publisher=J. Kershaw |page=145 |language=English |quote=Days of Fasting or Abstinence All the Fridays in the Year, except Christmas-Day}}</ref> Likewise, it is traditional for Anglicans and English Catholics to fast before Sunday services, with a larger meal to break the fast afterwards. These Christian religious rules created several traditional dishes in the United Kingdom.
 Only eating fish on Friday resulted in a British tradition of 'fish Fridays' which is still common in fish and chip shops and restaurants across the United Kingdom on Fridays, particularly during Lent.
 To mark the end of not being able to eat meat the Sunday roast was created as a mark of celebration.

There are two historical points on the origins of the modern Sunday roast. In the late 1700s, during the industrial revolution in the United Kingdom, families would place a cut of meat into the oven as they got ready for church. They would then add in vegetables such as potatoes, turnips and parsnips before going to church on a Sunday morning. When they returned from the church, the dinner was all but ready. The juices from the meat and vegetables were used to make a stock or gravy to pour on top of the dinner.
The second opinion holds that the Sunday roast dates back to medieval times, when the village serfs served the squire for six days a week. Then, on the Sunday, after the morning church service, serfs would assemble in a field and practise their battle techniques and were rewarded with a feast of oxen roasted on a spit.

Typical elements

Meat

Typical meats used for a Sunday roast are chicken, lamb, pork, or roast beef, although seasonally duck, goose, gammon, turkey, or (rarely) other game birds may be used.

Vegetables
Sunday roasts can be served with a range of boiled, steamed and/or roasted vegetables. The vegetables served vary seasonally and regionally, but will usually include roast potatoes, roasted in meat dripping or vegetable oil, and also gravy made from juices released by the roasting meat, perhaps supplemented by one or more stock cubes, gravy browning/thickening, roux or corn flour.

The potatoes can be cooked around the meat itself, absorbing the juices and fat directly (as in a traditional Cornish under-roast). However, many cooks prefer to cook the potatoes and the Yorkshire pudding in a hotter oven than that used for the joint and so remove the meat beforehand to rest and "settle" in a warm place.

Other vegetable dishes served with roast dinner can include mashed swede or turnips, roast parsnips, boiled or steamed cabbage, broccoli, green beans, and boiled carrots and peas. It is also not uncommon for leftover composite vegetable dishes—such as cauliflower cheese and stewed red cabbage to be served alongside the more usual assortment of plainly-cooked seasonal vegetables.

Accompaniments
Common traditional accompaniments include:

 beef: Yorkshire pudding, suet pudding; English mustard, or horseradish sauce. Roast beef with Yorkshire pudding accompanied by "roast potatoes, vegetables, and horseradish sauce" is considered by National Geographic as the national dish of England.
 pork: crackling and sage-and-onion stuffing; apple sauce or English mustard.
 lamb: mint sauce or jelly or redcurrant jelly.
 chicken'': sausages or sausage meat, stuffing, bread sauce, apple sauce, cranberry sauce or redcurrant jelly.

See also

 Carvery
 Pub grub

References

External links 
 

Baked foods
British cuisine
British chicken dishes
British pork dishes
Beef dishes
Lamb dishes
British-Australian culture
British-New Zealand culture
British-Canadian culture
Canadian cuisine
Australian cuisine
New Zealand cuisine
South African cuisine
Saint Helenian cuisine
Dinner
Food combinations
Irish-American culture
Irish-Canadian culture
Meals
Roast
Yorkshire cuisine
National dishes